Love: Live from the Point Depot is a digital live album by U2 released through the iTunes Music Store on November 23, 2004 as part of the digital box set, The Complete U2. The show was recorded during U2's Lovetown Tour on New Year's Eve 1989 at the Point Depot in Dublin.

The show had an international live radio broadcast and became one of the most heavily bootlegged U2 shows of all time. Fans were encouraged to tape a recording of the show, and issue #12 of U2's fan magazine Propaganda included a special cassette cover for those who taped the broadcast.

Along with the digital live album Live from Boston 1981, the album's tracks may not be purchased individually and is only available to those who purchase the entire digital box set. This release marks the show's first official release. It is not currently available for download from iTunes.

Track listing

Personnel
U2
Bono – lead vocals, guitar, harmonica
The Edge – guitar, keyboards, vocals; bass guitar on "40"
Adam Clayton – bass guitar, guitar on "40"
Larry Mullen Jr. – drums
With guest:
B. B. King – guitar, vocals (featured on "Angel of Harlem," "When Love Comes to Town," and "Love Rescue Me")

References

ITunes-exclusive releases
U2 live albums
2004 live albums
Interscope Records live albums
Island Records live albums